Edgar James Fitzgerald (born April 30, 1965) is a former American football defensive back who played for the Minnesota Vikings of the National Football League (NFL) in 1987. He played college football at Idaho State University.

Early life and education
Fitzgerald was born on April 30, 1965, in Spokane, Washington. He attended Gonzaga Preparatory School there, and was a member of their State AAA championship team. He later played college football for the Division I-AA Idaho State Bengals for two seasons. In his two seasons, Fitzgerald played as a defensive back and return specialist, and was described as a leader of the team's defense. As a sophomore in 1985, he led the team in tackles with 92 total, returned five interceptions, a team sophomore record, led Idaho State with 9.3 yards per punt return, and made 372 punt return yards, a mark which was 5th all-time in team history as of 2010. Fitzgerald was named to the Second-team All-Big Sky Conference. In a game against Northern Colorado, he returned a punt 62 yards for a touchdown as the Bengals won 44–17. Fitzgerald left the team prior to the 1986 season, after getting into a dispute with coach Jim Koetter.

Professional career
In , after being out of the sport for a year, Fitzgerald was signed by the Minnesota Vikings of the National Football League (NFL) during the NFLPA strike. He wore number 29, and appeared in two games as a substitute before being released at the end of the strike. The Vikings managed to make the playoffs that season, and Fitzgerald and the other replacement players received a bonus despite losing the games they played. He was invited back to the team in training camp in 1988 and 1989, being given contracts each year, but never made the final roster.

In 1991, Fitzgerald was selected by New York in the fifth round with the 42nd pick of the World League of American Football draft, but did not play for the team.

Later life
After his retirement from football, Fitzgerald was a defensive coordinator at Lake City High School in Coeur d'Alene, Idaho.

References 

1965 births
Living people
American football defensive backs
Minnesota Vikings players
Idaho State Bengals football players
Players of American football from Spokane, Washington